Revelation 7 is the seventh chapter of the Book of Revelation or the Apocalypse of John in the New Testament of the Christian Bible. The book is traditionally attributed to John the Apostle, but the precise identity of the author remains a point of academic debate. Chapter 6 to Chapter 8:5 record the opening of the Seven Seals. This chapter contains the writer's vision of "the Four Angels of the Four Winds", the sealing of the 144,000 and the "Praise of the Great Multitude of the Redeemed". The passage in this chapter is 'an intercalation in the numbered series of seven'.

Text
The original text was written in Koine Greek. This chapter is divided into 17 verses.

Textual witnesses
Some early manuscripts containing the text of this chapter are among others:
Papyrus 115 (ca. AD 275; extant verses 8–9)
Codex Sinaiticus (330-360)
Codex Alexandrinus (400-440)
Codex Ephraemi Rescriptus (ca. 450; extant verses 1-13)

The sealed of Israel (7:1–8)
While the judgement is held back by the four angels (verse 1), another angel announced the sealing of God's servants (verses 2–3). The sealing indicates God's
ownership as well as protection (cf. Ezek 9:4—6): these people are protected 'to serve God as the messianic army'. Just as a census in the Old Testament era provides the reckoning of Israel's
military strength, the counting of 144,000 persons of the twelve tribes of Israel (verses 4–8) indicates the strength of the messianic army who will fight the war against God's enemies in the last days. The tribe of Judah, being the tribe of the Messiah, is numbered first.

Verse 1
I saw four angels standing at the four corners of the earth, holding the four winds of the earth, that the wind should not blow on the earth, on the sea, or on any tree.
"Holding" is interpreted as "holding back" the winds. The noncomformist biblical commentator Matthew Henry suggests that "the blowing of the four winds together means a dreadful and general destruction". The Septuagint and Vulgate versions of Zechariah 6:5 refers to "the four winds of heaven", although the King James Version and many other translations refer to "the four spirits of the heavens". The Pulpit Commentary suggests that translation as "the four winds" is "doubtless correct": "the winds are supposed to be God's servants, waiting his pleasure to be sent forth on his errands". Jamieson, Fausset and Brown relate the holding back of judgment to the plea given to the saints on the opening of the fifth seal in Revelation 6:
“How long, O Lord, holy and true, until You judge and avenge our blood on those who dwell on the earth?” Then a white robe was given to each of them; and it was said to them that they should rest a little while longer ...

English clergyman John Keble uses the image in his poem, All Saints Day:
The four strong winds of Heaven fast bound.

Verse 4
And I heard the number of those who were sealed. One hundred and forty-four thousand of all the tribes of the children of Israel were sealed.
"The children of Israel": Greek: "the sons of Israel," normally denoting 'the Israelites as an ethnic entity' ("Twelve Tribes of Israel"), but many scholars see the expression in this context refer to Christians, instead.

Verses 5-8
Verses 5-8 list the tribes of Israel: 12,000 were sealed from each. The tribes of Dan and Ephraim are not listed.

Verse 9 
New King James Version
After these things I looked, and behold, a great multitude which no one could number, of all nations, tribes, peoples, and tongues, standing before the throne and before the Lamb, clothed with white robes, with palm branches in their hands,
What John hears in verse 4, the sealing of the 144,000, is reinterpreted by what he sees in verse 9, the appearance of a great multitude.

Verse 10 
New American Standard Bible
and they cry out with a loud voice, saying,“Salvation to our God who sits on the throne, and to the Lamb.”Verse 12"Amen! Blessing and glory and wisdom,Thanksgiving and honor and power and might,Be to our God forever and ever.Amen."This is the only instance in the New Testament of a prayer beginning and ending with "Amen".

Verse 14 
New King James VersionAnd I said to him, “Sir, you know.”
 So he said to me, “These are the ones who come out of the great tribulation, and washed their robes and made them white in the blood of the Lamb.

Verse 16 
New King James Version
 They shall neither hunger anymore nor thirst anymore; the sun shall not strike them, nor any heat;

Verse 17 
New King James Version
For the Lamb who is in the midst of the throne will shepherd them and lead them to living fountains of waters. And God will wipe away every tear from their eyes.”

See also
 David
 Jesus Christ
 John's vision of the Son of Man
 Judah (biblical person)
 Names and titles of Jesus in the New Testament
 Tetramorph
 Related Bible parts: Revelation 5, Revelation 6

Notes

References

Sources

External links
 King James Bible - Wikisource
English Translation with Parallel Latin Vulgate 
Online Bible at GospelHall.org (ESV, KJV, Darby, American Standard Version, Bible in Basic English)
Multiple bible versions at Bible Gateway (NKJV, NIV, NRSV etc.)

07